Yuzhu Station, formerly Maogang Station during planning, is a station on Line 5 and Line 13 of the Guangzhou Metro. It is located under Yumao Road near the south of the Maogang Interchange on Huangpu Avenue in  the Huangpu District. It opened in 28December 2009.

Station layout

Exits

References

Railway stations in China opened in 2009
Guangzhou Metro stations in Huangpu District